The Frenchtown School District is a community public school district that serves students in pre-kindergarten through eighth grade from Frenchtown, in Hunterdon County, New Jersey, United States.

As of the 2021–22 school year, the district, comprised of one school, had an enrollment of 109 students and 14.2 classroom teachers (on an FTE basis), for a student–teacher ratio of 7.7:1. In the 2016–17 school year, Frenchtown was tied for the 18th-smallest enrollment of any school district in the state, with 129 students.

The district is classified by the New Jersey Department of Education as being in District Factor Group "FG", the fourth-highest of eight groupings. District Factor Groups organize districts statewide to allow comparison by common socioeconomic characteristics of the local districts. From lowest socioeconomic status to highest, the categories are A, B, CD, DE, FG, GH, I and J.

Public school students in ninth through twelfth grades attend the Delaware Valley Regional High School in Frenchtown, which serves students in western Hunterdon County from Alexandria, Holland and Kingwood Townships along with the boroughs of Frenchtown and Milford. As of the 2021–22 school year, the high school had an enrollment of 719 students and 62.5 classroom teachers (on an FTE basis), for a student–teacher ratio of 11.5:1.

History
Prior to the completion of Delaware Valley Regional High School, which opened in September 1959, students from Frenchtown had attended Frenchtown High School, which held its final graduation ceremonies in June 1959. The school building had been built in 1925 to serve grades K-12, with the high school on the top floor. The school building was named for Edith Ort Thomas, who served as a teacher and board member for a half century.

School
Edith Ort Thomas Elementary School had an enrollment of 108 students in the 2021–22 school year.
James Hintenach, Principal

Administration
Core members of the school's administration are:
Michael Hughes, Interim Superintendent
Teresa O'Brien, Business Administrator

Board of Education
The district's board of education, comprised of seven members, sets policy and oversees the fiscal and educational operation of the district through its administration. As a Type II school district, the board's trustees are elected directly by voters to serve three-year terms of office on a staggered basis, with either two or three seats up for election each year held (since 2012) as part of the November general election. The board appoints a superintendent to oversee the district's day-to-day operations and a business administrator to supervise the business functions of the district. In February 2012, elections were shifted from April to November.

References

External links
Frenchtown Elementary School

School Data for the Frenchtown School District, National Center for Education Statistics
Delaware Valley Regional High School District

Frenchtown, New Jersey
New Jersey District Factor Group FG
School districts in Hunterdon County, New Jersey
Public K–8 schools in New Jersey